Mirozhsky Monastery  is a 12th-century Russian Orthodox monastery complex in Pskov, Russia, famous for its frescoes, located in the Christ's Transfiguration Cathedral. The name of the monastery is derived from the name of the Mirozha River, since the monastery is located at the place where the Mirozha joins the Velikaya River, on the left bank of the Velikaya. The catholicon of the monastery is one of the two pre-Mongol buildings which survived in Pskov, and contains the frescoes of the 12th century. The monastery, together with the Transfiguration Cathedral, is part of the Churches of the Pskov School of Architecture, which became an World Heritage Site in 2019.

History
The exact date of the founding of the monastery is not known. Traditionally, it is considered to be the mid-12th century and is associated with the name of Nifont, Bishop of Novgorod.

The monastery, located 20 minutes walk from the Pskov Krom (the other name for Kremlin), was one of the cultural centers of the city, comprising library, scriptorium and icon workshop.

Architecture
The ancient buildings, with the exception of the Christ's Transfiguration Cathedral, have not survived. Now the architectural ensemble consists of:
 Christ's Transfiguration Cathedral (12th–beginning of the 20th century)
 Prior’s house (16th—19th centuries)
 St Stephen's Church (17th century)
 Dorter, literally “Fraters’ House” (end of 18th—19th centuries)
 Cells (17th—19th centuries)
 Bathhouse (beginning of the 19th century)
 Outer wall (1799—1805)

References

External links 

 
 photos of the frescoes on Flickr
 photos of the frescoes on Picasa
 Mirozhsky Monastery (Pskov)

Pskov
Russian Orthodox monasteries in Russia
Eastern Orthodox church buildings
Buildings and structures in Pskov Oblast
Cultural heritage monuments of federal significance in Pskov Oblast